Irene Kurka (born 1974) is a German soprano.

Life 
Born in Darmstadt, Kurka studied singing with Reri Grist (Hochschule für Musik und Theater München) as well as with Barbara Hill Moore (Meadows School of the Arts / Southern Methodist University, Dallas) and Nancy Hermiston (University of British Columbia). She has also taken master classes with Emma Kirkby and Maria Jonas. In addition to musical theatre and oratorio roles, she is particularly interested in contemporary Lieder and has premiered numerous works.

Awards 

 2013  of the Bezirks Mittelfranken (Laudatio: Wilfried Krüger)
 2014 Music Award of the State Capital Düsseldorf

Podcasts 
 neue musik leben

Recordings 
 Klavierlieder von Eva-Maria Houben – Edition Wandelweiser  Records und Bayerischer Rundfunk (2017)
 Chants – Edition Wandelweiser  Records und Bayerischer Rundfunk (2017)
 Beten.Prayer – Edition Wandelweiser  Records und Bayerischer Rundfunk (2015)
 Hildegard von Bingen und John Cage – Edition Wandelweiser  Records und Bayerischer Rundfunk (2012)
 Stabat Mater – Makro Musikverlag  (2011)
 Two.too – Edition Wandelweiser Records (2009)
 Credo, Michael Denhoff – Cybele Records (2004)

See also

References

External links 
 
 
 
 Projekt: Zeitgenössisches Lied
 John Cage und Hildegard von Bingen. WDR-Rezension

German operatic sopranos
1974 births
Living people
Musicians from Darmstadt